The 1964–65 Michigan Tech Huskies men's ice hockey team represented Michigan Tech University in college ice hockey. In its 9th year under head coach John MacInnes the team compiled a 24–5–1 record and reached the NCAA tournament for the fourth time in its history. The Huskies defeated Boston College 8–2 in the championship game at the Meehan Auditorium in Providence, Rhode Island.

Season
With the last remnants of their first national championship team having graduated over the summer, John MacInnes moved Michigan Tech into a new era. With only six returning players from the year before, the Huskies were one of the least-experienced teams in the country (at last as far as college hockey) but the 1963 recruiting class would turn out to one of the best in history. With two good sophomore goaltenders to choose from, MacInnes decided to platoon his two netminders, allowing them to share the starting role and keep them well-rested throughout the season. With virtually no senior leadership on the team (both seniors were depth-players) all three captain roles were taken by juniors.

Michigan Tech began their season at home against Waterloo Lutheran (now called Wilfrid Laurier), winning both games easily, before travelling to Ontario to take on two senior teams and came away with two wins despite a scare in the second match. At the beginning of December MTU opened their conference schedule against North Dakota, taking both games against the Fighting Sioux and pushing their record to 6–0. Two weeks later the Huskies travelled to Grand Forks where UND repaid the favor by winning both of their home games to tie the two teams in the WCHA standings.

After the winter break Michigan Tech returned to the ice with pair of series against Minnesota–Duluth beginning with a road trip to Duluth. The Bulldog had been improving since becoming a top-tier program in 1961, producing their first winning campaign this season, but they were unable to stop the Huskies in any of the four games. The scored for all the matches were fairly close but MTU returned to their conference schedule with a 10–2 record, looking for a chance to head back to the NCAA Tournament.

Michigan Tech began a two-week road trip against Minnesota, splitting the series with the Golden Gophers, and ended by taking three points against last season's Runner-Up, Denver. MTU finished out the month of January at home against Michigan, but could only manage a split against the defending national champions. With a pedestrian 5–4–1 WCHA record Michigan Tech was in danger of dropping out of conference playoff contention and unless they finished in the top four in the conference they wouldn't have the change to make the NCAA Tournament.

MTU opened February with their 17th annual Winter Carnival, hosting Colorado College and winning two very important games. The next week they played host to Denver, who were themselves in danger of missing the WCHA Tournament, and earned a split with the Pioneers. Michigan Tech ended their regular season with another two-week road trip, playing both Michigan and Michigan State. While there was a chance that the Huskies could have been pushed out of the playoff picture at the outset, the Huskies took both games against the Spartans to guarantee themselves a postseason berth. While North Dakota was too far in front for them to catch, Michigan Tech could still gain home ice in the first round of the WCHA Tournament and with two wins against the Wolverines that's exactly what they did.

Michigan Tech opened their conference tournament against Minnesota with a 8–4 win, putting their opponents in a deep hole. The Huskies played safer in the second match, holding the Golden Gophers to 3 goals to earn a tie and win the total-goal series 11–7. The WCHA had changed the tournament schedule that year to have the championship game the week after the First Round rather than the day after. The extra time allowed Michigan Tech to rest and not have to rush 500 miles overnight so when they took on the Fighting Sioux they were ready for the fifth meeting between the two and were able to constrain one of the top offenses in the country to 4 goals while scoring s times themselves to win their second WCHA championship. Because the WCHA would change the playoff format the following season, Michigan Tech was the last solitary tournament champion for twelve seasons and were the last program to win the MacNaughton Cup as the postseason champion (the trophy would revert to a regular season championship trophy in 1966).

As the WCHA Champion Michigan Tech was given the top western seed and opened the 1965 NCAA Tournament as the home team despite playing in the home building of their opponent, Brown. The Huskies didn't give the partisan crowd much to cheer about, scoring twice in the first while holding the Bears to 8 shots. Rick Best held Brown scoreless for the entire game, earning the first ever shutout in tournament history while Senior Fred Dart scored twice to send MTU to their fourth championship game. Despite the shutout, MacInnes continued his goaltender rotation and put future Hall of Famer Tony Esposito in net against ECAC champion Boston College and, while Tony O kept BC off the scoresheet until late in the second, the Huskies as a whole were more than a match for the Eagles. Michigan Tech set a new championship record by scoring the first six goals of the game, a mark that has only been equaled one other time (by Michigan Tech in 1975) as of 2018. Five players combined for the six goals with only tournament MOP Gary Milroy scoring twice. BC's first goal came on a 5-on-3 power play but the game was in hand by that point and the two teams played out the final period without too much fanfare as MTU won the national championship.

Due to their thoroughly dominating performance in the two games, Michigan Tech tied a record by placing five players on the All-Tournament first team: Tony Esposito, Dennis Huculak, Pete Leiman, Gary Milroy and Wayne Weller. Only Esposito was named to AHCA All-American West Team and the All-WCHA First Team while Huculak and Milroy made the WCHA Second Team. Milroy finished second on the team in scoring, behind fellow sophomore Wayne Weller, and was named as the WCHA Sophomore of the Year.

Standings

Schedule

|-
!colspan=12 style=";" | Regular Season

|-
!colspan=12 style=";" | 

|-
!colspan=12 style=";" |

Roster and scoring statistics

Goaltending statistics

1965 championship game

E1 Boston College vs. W1 Michigan Tech

References

Michigan Tech Huskies men's ice hockey seasons
Michigan Tech
Michigan Tech
Michigan Tech
Michigan Tech
Michigan Tech
Michigan Tech